Robert de Sablé can refer to:

 Robert I de Sablé (1035–1098), seigneur de Craon, father of Robert II de Sablé
 Robert II de Sablé (1065–1110), seigneur de Sablé, grandfather of Robert III de Sablé
 Robert III de Sablé (1122–1152), seigneur de Sablé, father of Robert IV de Sablé
 Robert IV de Sablé (1150–1193), Grand Master of the Knights Templar